Avicenna is a lunar impact crater that lies on the far side of the Moon, just beyond the western limb on the northern rim of the Lorentz basin. It is named after the Persian polymath Avicenna. It lies to the north-northwest of the larger crater Nernst, and to the southeast of Bragg.

The northern half of Avicenna has been obliterated by subsequent, overlapping impacts. The southern and southeastern rim is worn and eroded, but the outline can still be discerned. There is a small crater lying across the southern rim, although this formation is equally worn. Several small craters lie across the southern extent of Avicenna's floor.

Satellite craters
By convention these features are identified on lunar maps by placing the letter on the side of the crater midpoint that is closest to Avicenna.

References

External links
 

Impact craters on the Moon